HD 77370 is a single star in the constellation Carina. It has the Bayer designation b2 Carinae; HD 77370 is the identifier from the Henry Draper catalogue. This object has a yellow-white hue and is visible to the naked eye with an apparent visual magnitude of 5.17. It is located at a distance of 85 light years from the Sun based on parallax, and is drifting further away with a radial velocity of +13 km/s.

This is an ordinary F-type main-sequence star with a stellar classification of F4V. It is around 1.3 billion years old and retains a relatively high projected rotational velocity of 60 km/s. The star has 1.45 times the mass of the Sun and 1.67 times the Sun's radius. It is radiating 4.8 times the luminosity of the Sun from its photosphere at an effective temperature of 6,699 K. The star is the most likely source of the X-ray emission detected at these coordinates.

References

F-type main-sequence stars
Carina (constellation)
Carinae, b2
Durchmusterung objects
Gliese and GJ objects
077370
044143
3598